State Trunk Highway 14 (often called Highway 14, STH-14 or WIS 14) was a number assigned to two different state highways in Wisconsin, United States:

 Highway 14 from 1917 to 1926, assigned the U.S. Route 8 designation in 1926
 Highway 14 from 1926 to 1933, currently routed as Highway 81 from Cassville to Beloit and Highway 15 from Beloit to Milwaukee
 For the highway in Wisconsin numbered 14 since 1933, see U.S. Route 14.

See also

External links

014